Alexanderia is a genus of moth flies in the subfamily Bruchomyiinae.  This genus circumscribes species from south-east Asia, with three including the type, transferred from the genus Nemopalpus.

Species
Alexanderia orientalis (Edwards, 1928)
Alexanderia thailandensis Polseela, Wagner, Kvifte, Rulik & Apiwathnisorn, 2018
Alexanderia unicolor (Edwards, 1933) - Borneo
Alexanderia vietnamensis (Quate, 1962)

References 

Psychodomorpha genera
Diptera of Asia
Psychodidae